Kibuli Muslim Tower, also Uganda Muslim Education Association Tower, or UMEA Tower, is a building under construction in Kampala, the capital and largest city of Uganda.

Location
The approximate coordinates of Kibuli Muslim Tower are 0°18'44.0"N, 32°35'54.0"E (Latitude:0.312222; Longitude:32.598333).

Overview
Kibuli Muslim Tower is owned by Uganda Muslim Education Association (UMEA). It comprises rentable residential apartments and commercial office space. UMEA is expected to maintain its headquarters at this location and avail the remaining space to residential and commercial tenants, for rent.

Construction
The construction contract was awarded to a consortium comprising two Ugandan companies; (a) Vcon Construction Uganda Limited, a member of the Ruparelia Group and (b) Ambitious Construction Limited. The consortium beat 14 other bidders in order to win the construction contract. Construction is expected to last one year and conclude during the first quarter of 2022. The supervising engineering company is Dolsar Engineering Limited of Turkey.

Funding
The  on which the tower stands were donated by Prince Kassim Nakibinge, "the titular head of the Muslim community in Uganda". UMEA borrowed the US10.4 million (USh38 billion) needed for erecting the building from the Islamic Development Bank (IsDB), headquartered in Saudi Arabia.

See also
 Islamic University in Uganda
 Kibuli Hospital
 Habib Medical School

References

External links
 Official website of Uganda Muslim Education Association (UMEA)

Buildings and structures in Kampala
Commercial buildings in Uganda
Makindye Division